Anne Hastings, Countess of Pembroke and 2nd Baroness Manny (24 July 1355 – 3 April 1384) was the daughter of Walter Manny, 1st Baron Manny and Margaret, Duchess of Norfolk.

In July 1368, she married John Hastings, 2nd Earl of Pembroke. They had one son, John Hastings, 3rd Earl of Pembroke. Her husband and father both died in 1375, and she became suo jure Baroness Manny (her one brother having died in his youth).

Shortly before her death in 1384, Anne was made a Lady of the Garter.

References

Pembroke, Anne Hastings, Countess of
Pembroke, Anne Hastings, Countess of
2
Pembroke, Anne Hastings, Countess of
Pembroke, Anne Hastings, Countess of
Manny, Anne Hastings, 2nd Baroness
Anne Hastings, Countess of Pembroke
14th-century English women
14th-century English people